is a private women's college in Kitakyushu, Fukuoka, Japan. The predecessor of the school was founded in 1922, and it was chartered as a university in 1994.

History 
1922 - Girls' School  was established by Southern Baptist missionary
1935 -  was established
1946 -  was established
1950 - Seinan Jo Gakuin Junior College was established(renamed "Seinan Jo Gakuin University Junior College" in 2004)
1993 - Seinan Jo Gakuin University was established

Faculties and departments 
Faculty of Health and Welfare Science

Faculty of Humanities

Attached schools 
Seinan Jo Gakuin University Junior College
Sion yama kindergarten attached to Seinan Jo Gakuin University Junior College
Seinan Jo Gakuin Junior & Senior High School

Annual events
Entrance ceremony: In April, the entrance ceremony is held in the form of a Christian worship ceremony.
The anniversary of the founding: In July, the day is a school holiday but first-year students and teachers attend a ceremony. Seinan Jo Gakuin University celebrated the ninetieth anniversary of the founding of the school in 2012.
Open campus: Open campus is an event to introduce Seinan Jo Gakuin University to high school students thinking about entering the University. University students serve as staff to guide the high school students around the campus.
College Festival: In October, the event is held at Seinan Jo Gakuin University. There are many refreshment booths run by students.
Graduation ceremony: In March

See also 
Seinan Gakuin University - University established by Southern Baptist missionary Charles Kelsey Dozier in Fukuoka.

References

External links
 Official website 

Educational institutions established in 1922
Christian universities and colleges in Japan
Private universities and colleges in Japan
Universities and colleges in Fukuoka Prefecture
Women's universities and colleges in Japan
1922 establishments in Japan